is a Japanese film from 2011 directed by Takahisa Zeze. It is based on the novel of the same name by Masashi Sada.

Cast
 Masaki Okada, as Kyohei Nagashima
 Nana Eikura, as Yuki Kubota
 Taizo Harada, as coworker Saso
 Tori Matsuzaka, as Shintaro Matsui
 Akira Emoto, Masashi Inoue
 Shingo Tsurumi, as Atsushi Furuta
 Kanji Tsuda
 Yoshiko Miyazaki, as Michiko

Filming
Filming was scheduled to commence in March 2011 at locations in Yamaguchi Prefecture, Shizuoka Prefecture, and Tokyo. Filming was completed by the end of April 2011.

Release
Life Back Then made its worldwide debut in the "World Competition" segment of the 35th Montreal World Film Festival. It made its premiere screening there on 19 August 2011. Furthermore, it was announced on 8 September 2011 that Life Back Then will be participating in the 24th Tokyo International Film Festival and the 16th Busan International Film Festival. In the 16th Busan International Film Festival, the film was showcased under the "A Window on Asian Cinema" program at the festival, which was held from 6 to 14 October 2011. It was also be showcased at the Tokyo International Film Festival on 24 October 2011.

Reception

Accolades

References

External links
  
 

Films based on Japanese novels
Films directed by Takahisa Zeze
2011 films
Shochiku films